Henry Connor Bost House is a historic home located near South River, Rowan County, North Carolina. It is also very close to Salisbury, NC.   It was built in 1869, and is a two-story, center-hall plan, Greek Revival style frame dwelling. It is sheathed in weatherboard and has a full-width, hipped roof porch. It was purchased in 1961 from the second owners and fully restored in 1993.

The home is surrounded by 135 acres of private rolling hills and woodlands.  The acreage is protected by the Three Rivers Land Trust.   It is now used as a special event venue and airbnb/vacation rental under the name of Henry Connor Bost House and Farm.  The family also uses the home for family gatherings/vacations.

It was listed on the National Register of Historic Places in 1982.

References

Houses on the National Register of Historic Places in North Carolina
Greek Revival houses in North Carolina
Houses completed in 1869
Houses in Rowan County, North Carolina
National Register of Historic Places in Rowan County, North Carolina
1869 establishments in North Carolina